Peter Mitterer (born 12 April 1947) is an Austrian archer. He competed in the men's individual event at the 1980 Summer Olympics.

References

1947 births
Living people
Austrian male archers
Olympic archers of Austria
Archers at the 1980 Summer Olympics
People from Gmunden
Sportspeople from Upper Austria
20th-century Austrian people